Jennie Bomb is the second album from the all-girl Swedish rock band, Sahara Hotnights. It was released in 2001 (2002 in the USA).  The album is named after band member Jennie Asplund.

The tracks, "Alright Alright (Here's My Fist Where's The Fight?)", "On Top of Your World", and "With Or Without Control" were released as singles.

Track listing

Swedish release
All songs written by Maria Andersson and Josephine Forsman.
 Alright Alright (Here's My Fist Where's the Fight) – 2:07
 On Top of Your World – 3:16
 Fire Alarm – 3:08
 With or Without Control – 3:34
 Keep Up the Speed – 3:07
 No Big Deal – 1:55
 Down and Out – 2:40
 Only the Fakes Survive – 3:42
 Whirlwind Reaper – 3:37
 Fall into Line – 3:28
 Are You Happy Now? – 2:33
 Out of the System – 2:39
 A Perfect Mess – 4:26

British release
The British release drops the 13th track, "A Perfect Mess"

"Alright Alright (Here's My Fist Where's the Fight?)"
"On Top of Your World"
"Fire Alarm"
"With or Without Control"
"Keep Up the Speed"
"No Big Deal"
"Down and Out"
"Only the Fakes Survive"
"Whirlwind Reaper"
"Fall into Line"
"Are You Happy Now?"
"Out of the System"

US release
The US release drops "Whirlwind Reaper" "Are You Happy Now?" and "A Perfect Mess", and adds "We're Not Going Down".  The track order is also changed, as follows:

"Alright Alright (Here's My Fist Where's the Fight?)"
"Keep Up the Speed"
"On Top of Your World"
"Fire Alarm"
"No Big Deal"
"With or Without Control"
"Down and Out"
"Only the Fakes Survive"
"Fall into Line"
"We're Not Going Down"
"Out of the System"

Deluxe version
The deluxe version comprises the US version of the album on disc one, and 4 bonus tracks on disc two.

Disc one
Same as US track listing, above.

Disc two
"Keep Up the Speed"
"Teenage Kicks"
"Breakdown"
"Now Tonight"

Australian Limited Edition
The Australian Limited Edition follows the US track listing for tracks 1-11, followed by 3 bonus tracks.

"Alright Alright (Here's My Fist Where's the Fight?)"
"Keep Up the Speed"
"On Top of Your World"
"Fire Alarm"
"No Big Deal"
"With or Without Control"
"Down and Out"
"Only the Fakes Survive"
"Fall into Line"
"We're Not Going Down"
"Out of the System"
"Breakdown"
"Now Tonight"
"Are You Happy Now?"

Personnel
Maria Andersson  – Lead vocals, guitar
Jennie Asplund  –  guitar, backing vocals
Johanna Asplund  –  bass, backing vocals
Josephine Forsman  – Drums

References

2001 albums
Sahara Hotnights albums
RCA Records albums